Nordisk Fond for Miljø og Udvikling is a Danish non-profit charity foundation. The foundation is headquartered in Copenhagen, Denmark.

Founded in 1990, the Nordisk Fond for Miljø og Udvikling has the declared goal of supporting local, innovative conservation and development initiatives in remote communities.

Aside from its small grants programme, Nordisk Fond for Miljø og Udvikling carries out independent research. See for instance http://onlinelibrary.wiley.com/doi/10.1111/j.1755-263X.2010.00159.x/full

The Nordisk Fond for Miljø og Udvikling is a member of the NGO Network of the Global Environment Facility, a volunteer structure of GEF-accredited organisations. See http://www.gefngo.org/formmaster.cfm?&menuid=12&action=view&orgid=688&preaction=main

External links
 Global Environment Facility
 NGO Network of the Global Environment Facility
 The International Monitoring Matters Network
 Opening Doors to Native Knowledge

Development charities based in Denmark